General elections were held in the Cayman Islands in November 1984. The ruling Team for National Unity led by Jim Bodden lost all eight seats due to a scandal over Caymanian banks being used to launder drug money. The opposition Progress with Dignity Team of Benson Ebanks won three seats in the Legislative Assembly, but the majority (nine) were won by independents. Ebanks subsequently became Chief Minister after forming a coalition.

Results

References

Elections in the Cayman Islands
Cayman
1984 in the Cayman Islands
Cayman
Election and referendum articles with incomplete results
November 1984 events in North America